Peperomia tetraphylla, known as the acorn peperomia or four-leaved peperomia, is a small plant in the Peperomia genus and the Piperaceae family that grows natively in tropical and subtropical regions around the world. Additionally in can found on Easter Island as an introduced species.

P. tetraphylla is a low-growing herb, with creeping stems, sometimes forming mats. The leaves are elliptic or round, growing in whorls of 3 to 4, typically green but might also be reddish on the underside. It grows in wet highland and evergreen forests, often as an epiphyte on top of trees or falles logs, but can also be found on rocky knolls or among grass by river banks.

The specific epithet tetraphylla is from the Ancient Greek language, meaning "four leaves". It was first described in 1832 by W.J. Hooker and G.A. Walker-Arnott after a coastal survey of South America under the command of Captain F.W. Beechey.

Three varieties are known: P. tetraphylla, Peperomia tetraphylla var. piedadeana, and Peperomia tetraphylla var. tenera.

References

Flora of New South Wales
Flora of Lord Howe Island
Flora of Queensland
Flora of New Zealand
Flora of Asia
Flora of Africa
tetraphylla